Maharishi is the pseudonym of T.K. Balasubramanian, a Tamil writer from Tamil Nadu, India. Many of his novels were made into films including the film Bhuvana Oru Kelvi Kuri (1977). Maharishi was born in Tanjore, but settled in Salem, Tamil Nadu. He worked as a clerk in the TNEB. His first novel Panimalai was made as film titled Ennathan Mudivu in 1965. Some of his other novels which were made into films are Bhadrakali (1977), Sainthadamma Sainthadu (1977), Vattathukkul Chaduram (1978), Nadhiyai Thedi Vandha Kadal (1980).

Maharishi has written around 130 novels, 5 short-story collections and 60 essays.

Books

Adharam Madhuram
Agni Valayam
Andha Poonai
Anna
Athuvaraiyil Kanchana
Bhadrakaali
Bhuvana Oru Kelvikuri
Eera Pudavai
Eera Vizhigal
Ethirkattru
Ennathaan Mudivu?
Garudanai Kaditha Paambu
Ilaiyudhir Kaalam
Ippadiye Oru Vazhkkai
Iraval Karu
Kaatril Mithantha Padagu
Kaatrodu Odiyavan!
Kadalora Pookal
Kalaintha Suruthi
Kalyaana Parisu
Kanavodu Sila Naatkal
Kanneer Pugai
Kanneer Thuliyil Kadalosai
Koodu Sellum Paravai
Jothi Vanthu Piranthaal
Jwalai
Kaandhamunai
Maanasa
Maanilam Enna Vilai?
Maganadhi
Manam Kavarndhavan
Manam Oru Brindhaavanam
Manthira Pushpam
Mara Seepu
Mega Chithirangal
Meganilal
Mohanaasthiram
Muthukal Pathu
Nadhiyai Thedivantha Kadal
Nallathor Veenai
Neruppin Matroru Mugam
Neruppu Kozhi
Nilavukku Yengiyavargal
Ninaivugal Unnoduthan...
Nizhalai Thediyavargal
Onrukkul Oraayiram
Oosi Munai
Oru Devathiyin Punnagai
Oru Munpanikaalam
Paadi Paranthaval
Panimalai
Panipor
Panichuvar
Panju Bommai
Paradhesi Kolam Thaandivittathu
Parvaiyile Sevaganai..!
Pattu Kudai
Poornima
Poo Potta Thaavani
Puthuiya Poo
Puzhudhi Puyal
Tharangini
Thattaamaalai
Therkaal
Thulasi
Thuyarangal Uranguvathillai
Saainthaadamma Saainthaadu
Sabthapathi
Sakkara Vandi
Sakkaram Ino Suzhalum
Snehamai Oru Kaadhal
Sooriya Paathai
Spatikam
Tharaiyil Piditha Meen
Unmaiyai Sonnavan
Uyirthudippu
Vaazhndhu Kaattuvom Vaa!
Vandichakkaram
Veera Sundhandhiram!
Vensangu
Vilayada Vanthaval
Vittil
Vittil Anaitha Vilakku
Vizhakolam
Yaagam

References

Writers from Tamil Nadu
Tamil writers
Indian Tamil people
20th-century Indian novelists
Indian male novelists
Novelists from Tamil Nadu
20th-century Indian male writers
1932 births
2019 deaths